Terence Thomas Kevin O'Leary (born 9 July 1954), also known as Mr. Wonderful and Maple Man, is a Canadian businessman, investor, journalist, and television personality. From 2004 to 2014, he appeared on various Canadian television shows. These include the business news programmes SqueezePlay and The Lang and O'Leary Exchange, as well as the reality television shows Dragons' Den and Redemption Inc. In 2008, he appeared on Discovery Channel's Project Earth. Since 2009, he has appeared on Shark Tank, the American version of Dragons' Den.

O'Leary co-founded SoftKey Software Products, a technology company that sold software geared toward family education and entertainment. During the late 1980s and 1990s, SoftKey acquired rival companies via hostile takeover bids, such as Compton's New Media, The Learning Company, and Broderbund. SoftKey later changed its name to The Learning Company and was acquired by Mattel in 1999, with the sale making O'Leary a multimillionaire. Mattel then fired him after the acquisition which resulted in significant losses and multiple shareholder lawsuits.

In 2017, he campaigned to be the leader of the Conservative Party of Canada. He was a frontrunner in the polls during much of that time but dropped out in April 2017, one month before the election, citing a lack of support in Quebec.

Early life and education
O'Leary was born on 9 July 1954, in Montreal, one of two sons of Georgette (née Bukalam), a small-business owner and investor of Lebanese descent, and Terry O'Leary, a salesman of Irish descent. Kevin's brother is Shane O'Leary. Due to his paternal heritage, O'Leary also holds Irish citizenship and carries an Irish passport. O'Leary had dyslexia which he argued helped him in the world of business.

O’Leary grew up in the Town of Mount Royal, Quebec. His parents divorced when he was a child, largely due to his father's alcoholism. His father died shortly after that, when O'Leary was only seven years old. After his father's death, his mother ran the business as an executive. His mother later married an economist, George Kanawaty, who worked with the UN's International Labour Organization. His stepfather's international assignments caused the family to move frequently, and O'Leary lived in many places while growing up, including Cambodia, Ethiopia, Tunisia, and Cyprus. In his youth, he met both Haile Selassie of Ethiopia and Pol Pot of Cambodia. O'Leary attended Stanstead College and St. George's School, both in Quebec.

O'Leary's mother was a skilled investor, investing a third of her weekly paycheque in large-cap, dividend-paying stocks and interest-bearing bonds, ultimately achieving high returns in her investment portfolio. She kept her investment portfolio secret, so O'Leary only discovered his mother's skill as an investor after her death, when her will was executed. Many of his investment lessons came from his mother, including the admonition to save one-third of his money.

O'Leary had aspired to become a photographer, but on the advice of his stepfather, attended university, where he continued to develop his interest in business and investing. He received an honours bachelor's degree in environmental studies and psychology from the University of Waterloo in 1977 and an MBA in entrepreneurship from the Ivey Business School at the University of Western Ontario in 1980.

Business career
In 1978, between the first and second years of his MBA program, O'Leary was selected for an internship at Nabisco in Downtown Toronto and then worked as an assistant brand manager for Nabisco's cat food brand. O'Leary credits his later success at The Learning Company to the skills he developed in marketing during his days at Nabisco.

After leaving Nabisco, O'Leary began a brief career as a television producer. With two of his former MBA classmates, Scott Mackenzie and Dave Toms (both of whom had assisted on O'Leary's MBA documentary), O'Leary co-founded Special Event Television (SET). SET was an independent television production company that produced original sports programming such as The Original Six, Don Cherry's Grapevine, and Bobby Orr and the Hockey Legends. The company achieved limited success with minor television shows, soccer films, sports documentaries, and short in-between-period commercials for local professional hockey games. One of his partners later bought out his share of the venture for $25,000.

Softkey 
After selling his SET share, O'Leary started Softkey in a Toronto basement in 1986, along with business partners John Freeman and Gary Babcock. The company was a publisher and distributor of CD based personal computer software for Windows and Macintosh computers. A major financial backer who had committed $250,000 in development capital to the company backed out the day before signing the documents and delivering his cheque, leaving O'Leary looking for funding to support the fledgling business. He used the proceeds from selling his SET share and convinced his mother to lend him $10,000 in seed capital to establish SoftKey Software Products.

The software and personal-computer industries were proliferating in the early 1980s, and O'Leary convinced printer manufacturers to bundle Softkey's program with their hardware. With distribution assured, the company developed several educational software products focused on mathematics and reading education. Softkey products typically consisted of software for home users, especially compilation discs containing various freeware or shareware games packaged in "jewel-case" CD-ROMs.

Softkey weathered stiff competition from other software companies in the late 1980s and prospered throughout the 1990s. By 1993, Softkey had become a major consolidator in the educational software market, acquiring rivals such as WordStar and Spinnaker Software. In 1995, Softkey acquired The Learning Company (TLC) for $606 million, adopting its name, and moved its headquarters to Cambridge, Massachusetts.

TLC lost $105 million (US) in 1998 on revenues of $800 million and suffered losses over the previous two years. TLC bought its former rival Brøderbund in June 1998 for $416 million.

In 1999, TLC was acquired by Mattel for US$4.2 billion. Sales and earnings for Mattel soon dropped, and O'Leary was fired. The purchase by Mattel was later called one of the most disastrous acquisitions in recent history. While acquisition management had projected a post-acquisition profit of US$50 million, Mattel actually experienced a loss of US$105 million. Mattel's stock dropped, wiping out US$3 billion of shareholder value in a single day. Mattel's shareholders later filed a class-action lawsuit accusing Mattel executives, O'Leary, and former TLC CEO Michael Perik of misleading investors about the health of TLC and the benefits of its acquisition. The lawsuit alleged that TLC used accounting tricks to hide losses and inflate quarterly revenues. O'Leary and his defendants disputed all of the charges. Mattel paid $122 million to settle the lawsuit in 2003. O'Leary blamed the technology meltdown and a culture clash of management of the two companies for the failure of the acquisition.

O'Leary and backers from Citigroup made an unsuccessful attempt to acquire the video game company Atari. O'Leary made plans to start a video-gaming television channel that never came to fruition.

StorageNow Holdings 
In 2003, O'Leary became a co-investor and corporate director at StorageNow Holdings, a Canadian developer of climate-controlled storage facilities, a company controlled by Reza Satchu and Asif Satchu. StorageNow became the operator of storage services in Canada, with facilities in 11 cities, and was acquired by Storage REIT in March 2007 for $110 million. He later sold his shares, originally worth $500,000, for a windfall profit of more than $4.5 million in realized capital gains.

In May 2005, Reza Satchu and O'Leary's operating partner, Wheeler, filed a $10-million wrongful dismissal lawsuit, charging that they had altered an agreed-upon compensation deal and illegally reduced Wheeler's share of the profits. O'Leary and Satchu claimed Wheeler failed to reach performance targets. The case was settled out of court.

Other ventures
In March 2007, O'Leary joined the advisory board of Genstar Capital, a private equity firm that focuses on investing in healthcare services, industrial technology, business services, and software. Genstar Capital appointed O'Leary to its Strategic Advisory Board to seek new investment opportunities for its $1.2 billion fund.

O'Leary Funds
In 2008, O'Leary co-founded O'Leary Funds Inc., a mutual fund company focused on global yield investing. He is the company's chairman and lead investor, while his brother Shane O'Leary serves as the director. The fund's assets under management grew from $400 million in 2011 to $1.2-billion in 2012. The fund's primary manager was Stanton Asset Management, a firm controlled by the husband-and-wife team of Connor O'Brien and Louise Ann Poirier.

According to research by Mark R. McQueen, the fund increased distribution yield from his funds by returning invested capital to shareholders. While this is not unusual, it was contrary to O'Leary's statements. Another analysis also found that one-quarter of the distributions from one of O'Leary's funds were return of capital.

In November 2014, O'Leary Funds Management agreed to pay penalties to the Autorité des marchés financiers for violating certain technical provisions of the Securities Act. At the time of the agreement, O'Leary Funds reported taking steps to correct the violations. On 15 October 2015, O'Leary Funds was sold to Canoe Financial, a private investment-management company owned by Canadian businessman W. Brett Wilson. He once was an investor with O'Leary on CBC's Dragons' Den.

O'Leary Ventures
O'Leary founded O'Leary Ventures, a private early-stage venture capital investment company, O'Leary Mortgages, O'Leary books, and O'Leary Fine Wines. In April 2014, O'Leary Mortgages closed.  
O’Leary's funds have a questionable history and are said to have declined over 20% in a year, often a big blow to fund managers. O’Leary no longer manages outside money.

ETF and investing 
On 14 July 2015, O'Leary launched an ETF through O'Shares Investments, a division of his investment fund, O'Leary Funds Management LP where O'Leary serves as chairman. A value investor, he has advised on personal finance. He advocates portfolio diversification and suggests that investors have their age as the percentage of bonds in their portfolios (i.e., 30% in bonds and 70% in stocks for a 30-year-old investor, with an increasing proportion of bonds and decreasing proportion of stocks as the investor ages). O'Leary has also "stated on many occasions that he won’t invest in publicly-traded stock unless it pays him a dividend."

O'Leary also ventured into gold investing, with five percent of his financial portfolio invested in physical gold. However, he does not invest in stocks of gold-mining companies because he says cash flow is an important investment factor to him. O'Leary also advises diversification in multiple industry sectors so that no more than 20% of one's financial portfolio is held in one sector.

Cryptocurrencies
O'Leary initially expressed skepticism of cryptocurrencies. In May 2019, O'Leary told CNBC bitcoin is "a digital game" and is a "useless currency". He illustrated his thinking with the following example, "Let's say you want to buy a piece of real estate for $10 million in Switzerland...They want a guarantee that the value comes back to the U.S. currency. You have to somehow hedge the risk of bitcoin. That means it's not a  real currency. That means the receiver is not willing to take the risk of the volatility it has. It's worthless."

In May 2021, O'Leary told Pomp podcast host Anthony Pompliano that he had made a 3 to 5% allocation to bitcoin and had become a strategic investor in the Vancouver-based decentralized finance platform Defi Ventures; the company then renamed itself WonderFi Technologies, in reference to O'Leary's nickname, "Mr. Wonderful".

In August 2021, it was announced O'Leary would take an ownership stake in the parent companies of FTX.com and FTX.US as part of his compensation for becoming a "spokesperson and ambassador" for FTX. FTX subsequently went bankrupt due to CEO Sam Bankman-Fried secretly using client funds to make speculative bets that were unsuccessful. In November 2022, O'Leary, alongside other spokespeople for FTX, was sued in a class-action lawsuit. There is precedent for prosecuting individuals promoting fraudulent cryptocurrency ventures—regardless of whether they had plausible deniability. For example, in February 2022, the U.S. 11th Circuit Court of Appeals ruled in a lawsuit against Bitconnect that the Securities Act of 1933 extends to targeted solicitation using social media. O'Leary claimed on CNBC that he was paid $15 million for the spokesman role, adding that he lost $9.7 million in digital assets, the remainder allotment in various fees and taxes, and a further million dollars' worth of equity after the company's insolvency. At an FTX hearing, O'Leary claimed Binance CEO Changpeng Zhao "put FTX out of business".

O'Leary has been an advocate of cryptocurrency investing and personally owns coins in the cryptocurrencies Ether, Polygon, SOL, Bitcoin, and Pawthereum.

Books
 Cold Hard Truth: On Business, Money & Life
 Cold Hard Truth on Men, Women, and Money: 50 Common Money Mistakes and How to Fix Them
 Cold Hard Truth on Family, Kids and Money
 Cold Hard Truth on Marriage and Money: Part Two of Cold Hard Truth on Family, Kids and Money
 The Balboa Boys and the Mystery of the Big Gyp
 Digital Pivot or Bust In a Post COVID-19 World: Why Small Businesses Must Re-Think Everything to Survive and Thrive!

In September 2011, O'Leary released his first book, Cold Hard Truth: On Business, Money & Life, in which he shares his views on family relationships, investing, money, and life. A sequel, The Cold Hard Truth on Men, Women, and Money: 50 Common Money Mistakes and How to Fix Them, was published in 2012. It focused on the importance of financial literacy and financial education as key cornerstone foundations for building achieving wealth. O'Leary released a follow-up book in 2013 in which he covers subjects relating to important life choices: education, careers, marriage and family, personal money management, and retirement. He discusses the obstacles of raising a family while working to provide financial stability and security for them and advises on developing financial literacy in family members, saving and investing money, and managing debt and credit.

Media

Dragons' Den and Shark Tank
In 2006, O'Leary appeared as one of the five follow-up venture capitalists on the then-new show Dragons' Den on CBC, the Canadian installment of the international Dragons' Den format. On the show, O'Leary developed a persona as a blunt, abrasive investor, who at one point told a contestant who started crying, "Money doesn't care. Your tears don't add any value." This television persona was encouraged by executive producer Stuart Coxe, who occasionally asked O'Leary to be "more evil" during the first two seasons. Dragons' Den became one of the most-watched shows in CBC history, with around two million viewers per episode. Coxe attributed the show's success in large part to O'Leary's presence.

In 2009, the American version of Dragons' Den, Shark Tank, began, and Shark Tank executive producer Mark Burnett invited two of the CBC Dragons' Den investors, O'Leary and Robert Herjavec, to appear on the show. Both have remained with Shark Tank since the beginning. For several years, they appeared on both shows, although Herjavec left Dragons' Den in 2012, and O'Leary left in 2014. Shark Tank became a ratings hit, averaging 9 million viewers per episode at its peak in the 2014–15 season. It has also been a critical favourite, winning the Primetime Emmy Award for Outstanding Structured Reality Program four times.

O'Leary's appearances on Dragons' Den and Shark Tank popularized the nickname "Mr. Wonderful" for him; he has said that he is often referred to by that name in public. O'Leary has said that the nickname serves both as a tongue-in-cheek reference to his reputation for being mean, as well as a reflection of his view that his blunt assessments are helpful to misguided entrepreneurs. In a 2013 interview, O'Leary implied that he could not remember how he got the nickname. He had already referred to himself as "Mr. Wonderful" in a 2006 casting video for Dragon's Den, predating either show.

Besides his blunt persona, O'Leary also gained a reputation on both shows for preferring deals in which he loans the entrepreneurs money in exchange for a percentage of future revenue, rather than taking a share of the company.

Notable deals in which O'Leary has been involved on Shark Tank include investments in Talbott Teas (later bought by Jamba Juice) and GrooveBook (later bought by Shutterfly), the latter with Mark Cuban. Recent investments include Hello Prenup with Nirav Tolia of Nextdoor. O'Leary has a holding company, called "Something Wonderful", for managing his Dragons' Den and Shark Tank investments.

Discovery Channel's Discovery Project Earth
In 2008, O'Leary worked as a co-host for the Discovery Channel's Discovery Project Earth, he is a punk who explores innovative ways to reverse climate change.

The Lang and O'Leary Exchange 
In 2009, O'Leary began appearing with journalist Amanda Lang on CBC News Network's The Lang and O'Leary Exchange. During a segment of The Lang & O'Leary Exchange on the Occupy Wall Street protests in 2011, O'Leary criticized Pulitzer Prize-winning journalist Chris Hedges for sounding "like a left-wing nutbar." Hedges said afterwards that "it will be the last time" he would appear on the show and compared the CBC to Fox News. CBC's ombudsman found O'Leary's behaviour to be a violation of the public broadcaster's journalistic standards.

In January 2014, on The Lang and O'Leary Exchange, O'Leary remarked, 

O'Leary later clarified these statements, saying,

Other projects
In 2009, O'Leary hosted a Winnipeg Comedy Festival gala called Savings & Groans in which he performed a Dragon's Den style sketch in which Sean Cullen and Ron Sparks tried to get him to invest in their invention - the wheel. The show aired on CBC in 2010.

O'Leary co-produced and hosted the 2012 reality show Redemption Inc., which aired for one season on CBC, in which ten ex-convicts competed to have O'Leary fund their business idea. Having also been a co-host of SqueezePlay on Bell Media's Business News Network (BNN), he returned to the Discovery Channel on 1 September 2014 to join as a contributor for its radio and television stations such as CTV.

On 5 May 2015, O'Leary made an appearance on the game show Celebrity Jeopardy and received $10,000 for his charity despite finishing 3rd and in negative points after both Double Jeopardy and Final Jeopardy rounds. 
In September that year, O'Leary appeared as a celebrity judge in the 95th Miss America pageant.

In 2018 O'Leary hosted the podcast Ask Mr. Wonderful for seven episodes. In 2019, he began regularly posting videos on YouTube, again under the title "Ask Mr. Wonderful".

In 2021, O'Leary appeared with Katie Phang and Ada Pozo on CNBC's Money Court, where they adjudicated financial disputes.

He is currently a member of ARHT Media's Board of Advisors, alongside Paul Anka and Carlos Slim.

Politics
In January 2016, O'Leary offered to invest $1 million in the economy of Alberta in exchange for the resignation of Premier Rachel Notley and appeared with four other prospective leadership candidates at a conference for federal Conservatives in late February 2016, where he gave a presentation titled "If I Run, This is How." During his speech, he predicted that the Liberal government would fall within four years of economic collapse.

2017 federal Conservative Party leadership race

Following Stephen Harper's resignation as leader of the Conservative Party of Canada, O'Leary attended Conservative Party gatherings in February and May 2016, leading to public speculation about whether he would run for 2017 leadership election.

In February 2016, Maxime Bernier, a Conservative Quebecois politician, criticized O'Leary, calling him a "tourist" for wanting to be prime minister without being able to speak French. Bernier later explained that he wanted all leadership candidates to learn French and praised his fellow leadership contender Lisa Raitt, who was trying to improve her French. O'Leary stated that he was taking French lessons, and he promised to learn French in time for the next federal election.

On 18 January 2017, O'Leary officially entered the Conservative leadership race. That same day, his former Dragons' Den co-star Arlene Dickinson stated that she found O'Leary to be too "self-interested and opportunistic" to be qualified for the office of prime minister. In response, another former Dragons' Den co-star, W. Brett Wilson, endorsed O'Leary, highlighting differences between O'Leary as a businessman and his TV persona.

On 1 February 2017, O'Leary posted a video of himself shooting in a Miami gun range. It was removed from Facebook out of respect for the funeral for three victims of the Quebec City mosque shooting on that day. It was also revealed that he was in New York promoting one of his business ventures when this occurred. O'Leary later apologized for the timing of this post.

Throughout his run for the leadership of the Conservative Party of Canada, O'Leary was compared in the press to U.S. President Donald Trump. Commentators noted that both were wealthy businessmen who gained greater fame as a result of appearing on reality television, prior to running for office, on a platform that included lowering taxes and regulations. Some commentators also found similarities in what they called both men's brash, outspoken style, though various also stated that O'Leary's bluntness, unlike Trump's, was simply part of a "carefully-cultivated persona".

O'Leary has praised Trump personally, calling him "smart as a fox", but tended to dismiss comparisons to him by noting that, in contrast to Trump's anti-illegal immigration rhetoric and specifically his pledge to build a wall on the Mexico–United States border, "I'm of Lebanese-Irish descent, I don't build walls, I am very proud of the society we're building in Canada, I think it is the envy of the planet. There's no walls in my world. I wouldn't exist if Canada had walls." Other commentators pointed out the differences between Trump and O'Leary on other issues, including free trade, abortion, marijuana legalization, and the future of NATO.

O'Leary was a frontrunner in the polls throughout most of his run. Nevertheless, he dropped out of the leadership race on 26 April 2017, stating that, though he still thought he could win the leadership election, a lack of support in Quebec meant that it would be difficult for him to beat Trudeau in 2019, and it would thus be "selfish" of him to continue. On dropping out, he endorsed Bernier, another frontrunner for the position. (Andrew Scheer eventually won the leadership election, narrowly edging out Bernier.)

Political positions

Economy and trade
O'Leary supports multilateral free trade agreements such as the North American Free Trade Agreement. He described hypothetical trade negotiations between Donald Trump and Justin Trudeau as "Godzilla versus Bambi". O'Leary believes corporate tax rates in Canada are too high, and has promised to eliminate the national carbon tax. O'Leary has threatened to punish provinces by withholding transfer payments if they do not eliminate their respective carbon taxes. O'Leary is a critic of deficit spending and supports eliminating the national debt.

O'Leary opposes control of the CRTC over Canada's telecommunications system.

Energy
O'Leary supports building a pipeline from the Athabasca oil sands to Eastern Canada with the intentions of making Canada "energy independent". He has criticized Canada's reliance on Saudi Arabia for oil and gas. He has stated he would support a national referendum on the issue of pipelines.

Social
O'Leary describes his social policies as "very liberal". He supports same-sex marriage and transgender rights. O'Leary supports the legalization and regulation of marijuana.

O'Leary supports assisted suicide and cited Switzerland as a model for Canada to follow.

He has accused Rep. Alexandria Ocasio-Cortez, a New York politician, of "killing jobs by the thousands", citing higher corporate taxes which she favors.

Foreign and military policy
O'Leary supported ending Canadian airstrikes on ISIS and supports taking a peacekeeping role in the Syrian Civil War.

O'Leary described Russia as "neither an ally or a foe" in an interview with the CBC.

O'Leary has criticized Justin Trudeau's procurement plan. He supports purchasing aerial combat drones to defend Canadian airspace and supports phasing out use of the Lockheed CP-140 Aurora citing cost reasons. He has criticized the lack of funding of the Canadian Armed Forces and supports spending the NATO recommended 2% of GDP on military expenditures.

Immigration
O'Leary has proposed creating a "fast track" for citizenship for immigrants who graduate from college or university and find employment, as well as for their spouses and children.

O'Leary has advocated for increased border security in order to tackle the issue of irregular border crossing.

Senate
In a 2017 interview with Evan Solomon, O'Leary suggested that Senators should pay money every year, instead of being paid, thus turning "a cost centre to Canada" into "a profit centre."

Leadership debt and lawsuit 
In November 2018, O'Leary hired lawyer Joseph Groia and sued Elections Canada and Canada's federal elections commissioner over campaign finance laws which limited candidates to spending only $25,000 of their own money for their leadership campaign. At the time of the lawsuit, O'Leary still owed $430,000 to creditors. O'Leary had proposed to Elections Canada that he pay off the debt now with his own money and fundraise the money later, but was rebuffed, since this would be illegal. O'Leary publicly stated that the law promoted mediocrity since rich people would be discouraged from running and hurt the businesses that had pledged money for his failed leadership campaign.

In O'Leary's legal submissions, he argued that the laws preventing the use of personal money over $25,000 were a restriction of his Section 2 Charter right to free expression and the threat of jail time in those laws violated his Section 7 right to security of the person.

Personal life
O'Leary and his wife, Linda, have been married since 1990. The couple separated in 2011, but they resumed their marriage after two years. Linda now serves as the VP of Marketing for O'Leary Wines. They have two children. Trevor is a graduate of McGill University who works as an engineer at Tesla, while Savannah is a multimedia producer and filmmaker based in New York City. In a 2016 interview, O'Leary stated: "In a successful growing business, it eats your time alive. Then later in life, you can provide for your family things that many others can't have. But because you sacrificed, you're then given the reward of freedom."

The O'Learys live in Miami Beach and Toronto. He also maintains a cottage in Muskoka, Ontario, as well as homes in Boston and Geneva, Switzerland. In a 2022 CNBC interview, he mentioned that he has obtained a UAE citizenship in order to be able to partner with Emiratis on investments.

O'Leary is a fan of the football team the New England Patriots and claims to watch all of their games, even when he is traveling around the world and games occur during the middle of the night. He is a wine aficionado and belongs to the Confrérie des Chevaliers du Tastevin, an international association of Burgundy wine enthusiasts. He is also a lifelong photographer and has exhibited and sold prints of his photographs, donating the proceeds to charity. O'Leary is also an avid watch collector and expert, sharing his insights on both Shark Tank and social media.

On 24 August 2019, O'Leary and his wife Linda were involved in a fatal crash on Lake Joseph in Muskoka, Ontario when they were on a boat owned by O'Leary and operated at the time by Linda. The O'Leary's boat collided with another one and a 64-year-old man and 48-year old woman on that vessel were killed.

O'Leary said in a statement that he was cooperating with the police investigation and that the other boat did not have its lights on and "fled the scene". The police stated that both boats left the scene to "attend a location", and both parties called 911." On 24 September, Linda O'Leary was charged with "careless operation of a vessel" under the small vessel regulations of the Canada Shipping Act, a charge that carries maximum 18 months imprisonment and a $10,000 fine. The driver of the other boat, Richard Ruh of Orchard Park, New York, was charged with "failing to exhibit navigation light while underway." On 11 October, the Public Prosecution Service of Canada ruled out jail time for Linda. On 14 September 2021, Linda was found not guilty of careless operation of the vessel.

Bibliography
 Cold Hard Truth: On Business, Money & Life. Doubleday Canada. 2011. 
 Cold Hard Truth on Men, Women & Money. Doubleday Canada. 2012. 
 Cold Hard Truth on Family, Kids and Money. Doubleday Canada. 2013.

See also
 List of University of Waterloo people

References

External links
 
 

1954 births
Anglophone Quebec people
Artists from Montreal
Businesspeople from Montreal
Businesspeople in information technology
Businesspeople in metals
Businesspeople in software
CTV Television Network people
Canadian Broadcasting Corporation people
Canadian art collectors
Canadian business and financial journalists
Canadian business writers
Canadian chairpersons of corporations
Canadian commodities traders
Canadian computer businesspeople
Canadian corporate directors
Canadian documentary film producers
Canadian expatriates in the United States
Canadian finance and investment writers
Canadian financial company founders
Canadian financiers
Canadian game show hosts
Canadian investors
Canadian money managers
Canadian motivational writers
Canadian people of Irish descent
Canadian people of Lebanese descent
Canadian photographers
Canadian real estate businesspeople
Canadian stock traders
Canadian technology chief executives
Canadian technology company founders
Canadian television company founders
Canadian television producers
Canadian television talk show hosts
Canadian venture capitalists
Canadian winemakers
Journalists from Montreal
Living people
Participants in American reality television series
Participants in Canadian reality television series
People associated with Bitcoin
People associated with cryptocurrency
People associated with Ethereum
People from Mount Royal, Quebec
Private equity and venture capital investors
Spokespersons
Stock and commodity market managers
University of Waterloo alumni
University of Western Ontario alumni
Writers from Montreal